Sara Kristina Thunebro (born 26 April 1979) is a Swedish former footballer who was a defender for the Sweden women's national team. At club level Thunebro played for Eskilstuna United DFF, Tyresö FF and Djurgårdens IF of the Damallsvenskan, as well as FFC Frankfurt of the Frauen-Bundesliga. Making her international debut in 2004, Thunebro won 132 caps and represented her country at the 2009 and 2013 editions of the UEFA Women's Championship. She also played at the 2007, 2011 and 2015 FIFA Women's World Cups, as well as the 2008 and 2012 Olympic football tournaments. An attacking left-back, her trademark on the field was her white headband.

Club career
Thunebro began playing at the age of six, eventually rising to the youth club Viljan IK. She advanced through the Damallsvenskan to one of the top-tier teams Djurgårdens IF. With Thunebro on the team, Djurgården won the Swedish Championship in 2003 and 2004. Djurgården also won the Swedish Cup in both 2004 and 2005, securing qualification for the UEFA Women's Cup. In 2005 Djurgården reached the final but were beaten by Turbine Potsdam.

After twice being voted the best defender in Sweden, Thunebro joined FFC Frankfurt in 2009. She extended her contract with the German club for another two years in April 2011.

After playing only three games in the first half of the season she left Frankfurt in March 2013 to join Tyresö FF in Sweden. She aimed to get more match practice ahead of the UEFA Women's Euro 2013 in her home country.

After one season at Tyresö she moved on again, to newly promoted Damallsvenskan club Eskilstuna United DFF. In announcing the transfer in December 2013, Thunebro admitted she moved to be based closer to her family. After the 2015 season in which Eskilstuna finished as runners-up to FC Rosengård, Thunebro made the difficult decision to retire from playing. Coach Viktor Eriksson thanked Thunebro for her part in establishing the club in the top league and described it as an honour to have worked with her for two years.

International career
A 3–0 defeat to the United States in January 2004 was Thunebro's first appearance for the senior Swedish national team. She had already collected 32 caps at Under-23 level, eight at Under-19 and 10 at Under-17. She remained on the fringes of the squad but was left out of the selection for UEFA Women's Euro 2005. Thunebro travelled to China for the 2007 FIFA Women's World Cup but made just one appearance during Sweden's exit at the group stage. Returning to China for the following year's Olympic football tournament, Thunebro had become a regular starter in the team which reached the quarter finals.

By 2009 Thunebro was an important part of an in–form Swedish team who were enjoying victories over Germany, Brazil and the United States. "Each year I've taken small steps forward," she explained. "I feel in great form now, but I haven't reached my peak yet." At UEFA Women's Euro 2009 Sweden reached the quarter finals only to be eliminated by Norway.

At the 2011 FIFA Women's World Cup in Germany Thunebro won a bronze medal with Sweden, who were beaten by eventual winners Japan in the semi final. Third place secured Sweden's qualification for the 2012 Olympic football tournament in London. In September 2011 Thunebro announced her intention to retire from international football after the UEFA Women's Euro 2013 tournament in her home country.

After the tournament, Thunebro relented and was selected by national coach Pia Sundhage for Sweden's 2015 FIFA Women's World Cup qualification campaign. In May 2015, Thunebro and Eskilstuna team-mates Olivia Schough and Malin Diaz were confirmed in Sundhage's Sweden squad for the 2015 FIFA Women's World Cup in Canada.

Following Sweden's second round elimination in Canada Thunebro quit international football. She had received only 15 minutes of playing time as the team failed to win any of their four matches at the tournament. Thunebro felt that she no longer had coach Sundhage's confidence and did not want to sit on the substitute's bench to make up the numbers.

Matches and goals scored at World Cup & Olympic tournaments

Matches and goals scored at European Championship tournaments

Personal life
Thunebro enjoys playing golf and rides a motorcycle. Throughout her career she did not employ an agent. Part of the reason she wore her trademark headband was to allow her grandmother to easily identify her while watching on the television.

Honours

Club 
 Djurgården/Älvsjö
 Damallsvenskan (2): 2003, 2004
 Svenska Cupen (3): 1999–00, 2004, 2005

 FFC Frankfurt
 DFB-Pokal (1): 2011

Country
Sweden
2007 FIFA Women's World Cup: Group stage
2011 FIFA Women's World Cup: Third place
2015 FIFA Women's World Cup: Round of 16
2004 Summer Olympics in Athens: Fourth place
2008 Summer Olympics in Beijing: Quarter-final
2012 Summer Olympics in London: Quarter-final
UEFA Women's Euro 2009: Quarter-final
UEFA Women's Euro 2013: Semi-finals
Algarve Cup (Participated from 2004 to 2015): Winner 2009

Sweden U19
 UEFA Women's Under-19 Championship:  Semi-Finalists 1998

Individual
 Swedish Defender of the Year: 2008, 2009

Footnotes

References

Match reports

External links

 
 
 Profile  at SvFF
 
 Player domestic stats  at DFB
 Club Statistics

 Olympic Profile
 

1979 births
Living people
Swedish women's footballers
Olympic footballers of Sweden
Footballers at the 2008 Summer Olympics
Footballers at the 2012 Summer Olympics
Sweden women's international footballers
1. FFC Frankfurt players
Expatriate women's footballers in Germany
Swedish expatriate sportspeople in Germany
2011 FIFA Women's World Cup players
2015 FIFA Women's World Cup players
FIFA Century Club
Tyresö FF players
Eskilstuna United DFF players
Damallsvenskan players
Djurgårdens IF Fotboll (women) players
People from Eskilstuna
Women's association football defenders
Frauen-Bundesliga players
2007 FIFA Women's World Cup players
Sportspeople from Södermanland County
Gideonsbergs IF players